Spellbound! is an educational computer game made and distributed by The Learning Company aimed at teaching spelling, vocabulary, and language development to children ages 7 to 12 years. The objective of the game is to play spelling-related games to qualify and compete for successively higher bracket spelling bees, concluding with the player competing in the national spelling bee. The original game, released in 1991, was compatible with computers running DOS 3.3 or higher. A 1993 CD release added spoken dialogue and was compatible with Windows 95 and Macintosh.

Plot
Morty Maxwell along with his robots are entering Shady Glen school's Spelling Bee in the hopes of outspelling everyone. The Super Solvers aim to sharpen their skills and beat Morty at his own game in Washington, D.C. with the aid of a Spellbinder computer.

Gameplay
Before starting the game, the player can choose which topics and word lists to use. Additionally, the player can create customized lists. Then the player can choose one of three difficulty levels, which affect how many spelling problems need to be solved throughout the game. To qualify for a spelling bee, the player must first earn a set number of points by playing spelling-related activities. These activities include:

 Criss Cross (also called "Work it out!") - a crossword-type puzzle
 Flash Cards (also called "Watch it Flash!") - where the player must recall the word shown
 Word search (also called "Find them All!") - finding words hidden in a box of letters

Once in the spelling bee (also called "Take a Trip!"), the player will be contested by two other players and must correctly type words flashed out or vocally spoken to win the game. When the spelling bee is completed, the player moves on to the next level to prepare for another spelling bee. There are five levels of spelling bees in the game. As the levels get higher, the activities become harder.

Release
Spellbound! was released along with an Adlib Sound Card in "The Learning Company's Family Sound Value Pack".

Reception

Spellbound! was reviewed in the Oppenheim Toy Portfolio Guide Book where it was praised for its "state of the arts" graphics and sound support. The reviewers noted that it takes a lot to make learning how to spell fun, "but the Learning Company has done it!" Moderately well received, the game received two and a half stars out of five from Allgame.

References

External links
 

1991 video games
Apple II games
Children's educational video games
DOS games
Classic Mac OS games
North America-exclusive video games
Windows games
Spelling competitions
The Learning Company games
Video games developed in the United States
Single-player video games